This is a list of the sources of some of the place names in the city of Philadelphia, Pennsylvania:

Streets

Place names

See also

References

Place names, etymologies of
Streets in Philadelphia
Philadelphia, Pennsylvania, place names in, etymologies of
Philadelphia